Charadai (or Charaday) is a village in Chaco Province, Argentina. It is the head town of the Tapenagá Department.

External links

Populated places in Chaco Province
Populated places established in 1905
1905 establishments in Argentina